Gerard Joseph Foschini (born February 28, 1940, in Jersey City, New Jersey), is an American telecommunications engineer who has worked for Bell Laboratories since 1961, but is now retired. His research has covered many kinds of data communications, particularly wireless communications and optical communications. Foschini has also worked on point-to-point systems and networks.

Biography
Foschini received the B.S.E.E. degree from the New Jersey Institute of Technology, the M.E.E. degree from New York University and a Ph.D. (1967) from the Stevens Institute of Technology. In December 1962, he joined AT&T Bell Laboratories, where he has worked since. He has also taught at Princeton University and Rutgers University.

Within the telecommunications engineering field, he is best known for his invention of Bell Laboratories Layered Space-Time (BLAST). This is a scheme for use in wireless communications which recommends the use of multiple antennas at both the transmitter and receiver. By careful allocation of the data to be transmitted to the transmitting antennas, multiple data streams can be transmitted simultaneously within a single frequency band — the data capacity of the system then grows directly in line with the number of antennas. This represents a significant advance on current, single-antenna systems.

Foschini's 1996 paper (not published until 1998), "On limits of wireless communications in a fading environment when using multiple antennas",[1] played a key role advancing multiple-input multiple-output wireless systems. Shortly after that publication, in a technical memorandum for his employers,[2] Foschini introduced the BLAST concept which is one of the most widely examined techniques in wireless communications research today. Among his later contributions, the paper offering a simplified form of the original BLAST architecture, called Vertical BLAST (V-BLAST),[3] has also resulted in intensive international research efforts. In 2002, Bell Laboratories' patent on BLAST was named by MIT's Technology Review Magazine as one of five "Patents to watch". According to the Institute for Scientific Information Foschini is in the top 0.5% of most widely cited authors.

In 2002, Foschini received the Thomas Alva Edison Patent Award, an honor given to people from New Jersey who have changed the world with their inventions; he has also received the Bell Labs Inventor's Award, Gold Award and Teamwork Award and holds the titles of "Distinguished Member of Staff, Distinguished Inventor"  in the Laboratories. 
Before his work on BLAST, Foschini had already been elected a Fellow of the Institute of Electrical and Electronics Engineers in 1986, "for contributions to communications theory".

Foschini received the 2008 IEEE Alexander Graham Bell Medal "For seminal contributions to the science and technology of multiple-antenna wireless communications." And the IEEE Eric E. Sumner Award in 2006. Also in 2008 he received the New Jersey Institute of Technology Alumni Achievement Honor Roll Award and the IEEE Communication Theory Committee Technical Achievement Award. On March 28, 2015, he received the Stevens Technology Distinguished Alumni Award for Engineering, and is part of the Stevens Institute of Technology top 150 in 150 years.

In 2018, Foschini was honored as an NJIT magazine Top Influencer from the Institution.

In 2009, Foschini was elected to the National Academy of Engineering.

Publications

References

1940 births
Living people
People from Jersey City, New Jersey
20th-century American inventors
American people of Italian descent
American electrical engineers
Engineers from New Jersey
Fellow Members of the IEEE
Members of the United States National Academy of Engineering
New Jersey Institute of Technology alumni
Polytechnic Institute of New York University alumni
Princeton University faculty
Rutgers University faculty
Scientists at Bell Labs
Stevens Institute of Technology alumni
Wireless technology people